Shirley J. McKague (née Woolard, December 4, 1935 – May 21, 2020) was an American politician from Idaho. She was an Idaho State Senator, representing the 20th District as a Republican from 2007 to 2012. She previously served as an Idaho State Representative for Districts 14B and 20B from 1997 until her appointment to fill the vacancy caused by the resignation of Senator Gerry Sweet.

Early life and career
McKague was born in Nampa, Idaho in 1935 and raised in Meridian. She graduated Nampa High School in 1953. McKague and her husband Paul have six children.

Before entering politics, McKague was a:
 Secretary, Idaho State House, 1986–1996
 Columnist, Valley Times, 1980–1982
 Business Partner/Book Keeper, Family Service Station, 1969–1996
 Legal Secretary, Carey Nixon, Esquire, 1963–1970
 Stenographer, Idaho Public Utilities Commission, 1960–1963

Political career
McKague previously worked as: 
 Idaho State Representative, 1997–2007
 House Committee Secretary, 1986–1997
 Precinct Worker and Committeeman, 1986

Committees
McKague was a member of:
 Senate Judiciary and Rules Committee
 Senate Local Government and Taxation Committee

Elections

Idaho Senate District 20 
In February 2012, McKague announced her retirement and endorsed fellow Republican Senator Chuck Winder; redistricting had placed them both in the newly redrawn Senate District 20. McKague worked until the end of the legislative session in December 2012.

2010 
McKague defeated Mike Vuittonet in the Republican primary with 60.1% of the vote.  McKague was unopposed in the general election.

2008 
McKague defeated Mark Snodgrass in the Republican primary with 53.4% of the vote. McKague defeated Democratic nominee Laurynda "Ryndy" Williams with 68.7% of the vote in the general election.

McKague was appointed to the vacant Senate seat for District 20 caused by the resignation of Senator Gerry Sweet, took office early in 2007.

Idaho House of Representatives District 20 Seat B

2006 
McKague was unopposed in the Republican primary. McKague defeated Democratic nominee Chuck Oxley and Libertarian nominee Kevin Charles Jaeger with 65.59% of the vote in the general election.

2004 
McKague was unopposed in the Republican primary. McKague defeated Democratic nominee Kenton S. Travis with 65.6% of the vote in the general election.

2002 
McKague was unopposed in the Republican primary. McKague defeated Democratic nominee Richard Harlan and Libertarian nominee David Lieberman.

Idaho House of Representatives District 14 Seat B

2000 
McKague defeated Steve Coyle, and Trevor A. Chadwick in the Republican primary with 62.8% of the vote. McKague defeated Democratic nominee Jim Corey with 61.1% of the vote.

1998 
McKague defeated Milt Erhart again in the Republican primary with 61.1% of the vote. McKague defeated Gilda Bothwell this time as the Natural Law nominee and Platt Thompson Reform party nominee with 80.6% of the vote.

1996 
McKague defeated WesLee Hoalst, and Milt Erhart in the Republican primary with 45% of the vote. McKague defeated Democratic nominee Glida Bothwell with 67.3% of the vote in the general election.

References

External links 
Official government profile at the Idaho Legislature

1935 births
2020 deaths
Businesspeople from Idaho
Republican Party Idaho state senators
Journalists from Idaho
Republican Party members of the Idaho House of Representatives
People from Meridian, Idaho
People from Nampa, Idaho
Women state legislators in Idaho
21st-century American women